Al-Khalisa was a Palestinian Arab village situated on a low hill on the northwestern edge of the Hula Valley of over 1,800 located  north of Safad. It was depopulated in the 1948 Palestine war.

History
Al-Khalisa was founded by the Bedouin from the 'Arab al-Ghawarina clan, who constituted the bulk the village's population. Under the Ottoman Empire, in the 1596 tax records, it had a population of 29 Muslim households, an estimated 160 persons, and was under the administration of the nahiya ("subdistrict") of Jira, part of Sanjak Safad. The villagers  paid a fixed tax rate of 25% on various agricultural products, including wheat, barley, orchards, beehives, in addition to  water buffalos and a water-powered mill; a total of 5,449  akçe.

In 1875, Victor Guérin traveled in the region, and noted about Al-Khalisa (which he called Khalsah): "At the bottom and west of this tell, is a small village of very recent foundation, called Khalsah; it was built on the site and partly with the materials of another older one. The gardens that surround it are watered by the waters of l'A'ïn Dahab."
In 1881, the PEF's Survey of Western Palestine described al-Khalisa as a village built of stone, surrounded by streams, with a population of 50.

British Mandate era
The houses of the village were built of bricks and basalt stones cut from the hillside. Al-Khalisa had a boys' elementary school which also admitted students from neighboring villages. The residents drew their drinking water from several springs.  It was one of five villages in the Galilee to be governed by a village council that administered in local affairs.

The leader of  'Arab al-Ghawarina  clan was Sheikh Kamal Hussein, resident of  Al-Khalisa, and, according to Meron Benvenisti, he led the raid on Tel Hai in 1920.  However, in the years preceding 1948, Sheikh Kamal established close relationships with the Jewish settlers, but, according to Benvenisti, the veterans of Kfar Giladi did not forget or forgive, and cultivated Sheikh Kamal's enemy Emir Faour.

In the 1931 census of Palestine, the population of El Khalisa was 1,369;  1,340 Muslims, 3 Jews and 26 Christians, in a total of 259 houses.

In the 1945 statistics, its population was 1,840, of which 20 were Christians, and the total land area were 11,280 dunams. Of this, 5,586 dunams were irrigated or used for plantations, 3,775 for cereals, while 20 dunams were classified as urban land.

1948, and after
The residents of al-Khalisa left their homes on 11 May 1948 following the rejection of approaches made by them to the Haganah asking for an "agreement".  According to Yigal Allon, the commander of Operation Yiftach, the villagers left following his Whispering Campaign. This involved instructing  the leaders of Jewish villages in the area to warn their neighbours that "a great Jewish reinforcement has arrived in Galilee and that it is going to burn all the villages of the Huleh." Post-war IDF analysis seems to undermine this claim. Allon himself writes that the fall of Safad and the success of Operation Matateh were also reasons for the villagers departure. He describes them as some of "the tens of thousands of sulky Arabs who remained in Galilee." He also states that "The building of the police station at Halsa (al-Khalisa) fell into our hands without a shot."

The village's residents stated that after they fled, only the local militia remained, but withdrew after shelling from the Jewish town of Manara and after seeing an armored unit approaching al-Khalisa.  Former villagers, interviewed in Tel al-Zaatar camp in Lebanon in 1973, recounted that when they returned to the village; 
We found that the Jews had burned and destroyed the houses belonging to Ali Zakayan, Abu Ali Muhammad Hamadih, Mustafa al-Haj Yusif, Issa Muhammad, Ali Salih Ahmad, Muhammad Arab al-Haj Mahmud, Salih Ismail, Sari al-Khadir, Dawud Hussein, Abdul-Raziq Hamid, Qassim Muhammead al-Salih and Ali Hussein Mahmud ... The village was in ruins. 

According to Walid Khalidi, 1992, "stone rubble from the houses markes the site. The school and the Mandate government´s office buildings stand abandoned, as does the village mosque and minaret. The level land surrounding the site is cultivated by settlement of Qirat Shemona, while the mountainous areas are either used as pastures or are wooded."

According to Meron Benvenisti, 2000, "the mosque of al-Khalsa, one of the few structures that remain of that Galilee Arab village, is situated in a municipal park in the older section of the Jewish town of Kiryat Shemona. It serves as the local museum dedicated to the memory of townspeople who have fallen in Israel's various wars."

See also
Depopulated Palestinian locations in Israel

References

Bibliography

 
 
 

  

    (Khalisa, p. 197)

External links
Welcome to al-Khalisa
al-Khalisa, Zochrot
Survey of Western Palestine, Map 2:  IAA, Wikimedia commons 
al-Khalisa, from the Khalil Sakakini Cultural Center
 al-Khalisa  Dr. Khalil Rizk.

Arab villages depopulated during the 1948 Arab–Israeli War
District of Safad
Former mosques